The Western Athletic Conference (WAC) sponsored football and crowned a champion every year from 1962 to 2012. Once considered one of the best conferences in college football, steady attrition from 1999 to 2012 forced the WAC to drop football after fifty-one years.

On January 14, 2021, the WAC announced its intention to reinstate football as a conference-sponsored sport at the NCAA Division I Football Championship Subdivision (FCS) level, as well as the addition of five new members to the conference in all sports, including football. The new members announced include: Abilene Christian University, Lamar University, Sam Houston State University, and Stephen F. Austin State University, all currently of the Southland Conference (SLC), along with Southern Utah University, currently of the Big Sky Conference. Original plans were for all new members to join in July 2022, but after the SLC expelled its departing members, the WAC moved the arrival of those four schools and the relaunch of football to July 2021. Southern Utah's entry remained on the 2022 schedule. The WAC football league also included Dixie State University (renamed Utah Tech University in 2022) and Tarleton State University, both of which played as FCS independents in 2020–21 after having moved from NCAA Division II to the WAC for non-football sports in July 2020. The conference also announced that it will most likely add another football-playing institution at a later date. The conference has been speculated to move back up to the NCAA Division I Football Bowl Subdivision (FBS) in the future following the reestablishment of the football conference at the FCS level.

On the same day, news broke that The University of Texas Rio Grande Valley (UTRGV), a non-football playing member of the conference, had committed to create an FCS football program by 2024. At the time, the program would most likely have competed as part of the newly-reinstated WAC football conference.

For its first two planned seasons in 2021 and 2022, the relaunched WAC football league was branded as the ASUN–WAC (or WAC–ASUN) Challenge, with the WAC establishing a temporary football partnership with the ASUN Conference. The ASUN eventually started its own FCS football league in 2022. Under the partnership, three FCS programs that joined the ASUN in July 2021 played alongside current WAC members.

The ASUN–WAC partnership was renewed for the 2022 season after the start of FBS transitions by ASUN member Jacksonville State and WAC member Sam Houston rendered both ineligible for the FCS playoffs, also dropping both conferences below the 6 football members needed to qualify for an automatic berth in the FCS playoffs. The WAC's playoff-eligible membership soon dropped further to 3, after Incarnate Word backed out of its planned move from the SLC to the WAC and Lamar, which had announced it would leave the WAC in 2023 to return to the SLC, accelerated this move to 2022.

The 2022 season proved to be the last for the WAC as a standalone football conference. On December 20, 2022, the ASUN and WAC jointly announced that they would fully merge their football conferences effective with the 2023 season under the tentative name of ASUN–WAC Football Conference. The ASUN is contributing Austin Peay, Central Arkansas, Eastern Kentucky, and North Alabama to the new league, with the WAC contributing Abilene Christian, Southern Utah, Stephen F. Austin, Tarleton, and Utah Tech. UTRGV, which put off the start of its football program to 2025, will join at that time. The merged conference will play a six-game schedule in 2023 before adopting a full round-robin in 2024.

Former members
The WAC has 27 former football-playing members.

Current members
The WAC resumed play in the 2021 fall season with 9 members. Before the reinstatement of football was officially announced, media reports indicated that the WAC might add two more schools to join the conference for football. On the same day that WAC confirmed the return of football, full conference member UTRGV announced that it would start an FCS football program no later than 2024. By the end of January 2021, three more schools were brought into WAC football for the 2021 fall season only. All are incoming members of the ASUN Conference, which plans to start an FCS football league in 2022. The WAC–ASUN Challenge consists of the seven teams that are eligible for the FCS playoffs. Utah Tech and Tarleton are included in alliance scheduling, but because of their ongoing transitions from NCAA Division II to Division I are ineligible for the playoffs until the 2024 season. Games against these schools do not count in alliance standings, although games against full WAC members count in the separate WAC league table. Jacksonville State and Sam Houston State will leave the WAC for the 2023 season as they begin transitioning to the FBS level as members of Conference USA.
  
{| class="wikitable sortable" style="text-align: center;"
|-
! Team || Location || Nickname || Stadium || Capacity ||Current Primary Conference || Starting Year
|-
|Abilene Christian
|Abilene, TX
|Wildcats
|Anthony Field at Wildcat Stadium
|12,000
| WAC
|2021
|-
| Central Arkansas
| Conway, AR
| Bears
|Estes Stadium
|12,000
| ASUN
|2021
|-
|Eastern Kentucky
|Richmond, KY
|Colonels
|Roy Kidd Stadium
|20,000
| ASUN
|2021
|-
|Jacksonville State
|Jacksonville, AL
|Gamecocks
|Burgess–Snow Field at JSU Stadium
|24,000
| ASUN
|2021
|-
|Sam Houston State
|Huntsville, TX
|Bearkats
|Bowers Stadium
|12,593
| WAC
|2021
|-
|Stephen F. Austin
|Nacogdoches, TX
|Lumberjacks
|Homer Bryce Stadium
|14,575
| WAC
|2021
|-
|Tarleton State
|Stephenville, TX
|Texans
|Memorial Stadium
|17,000
| WAC
|2021
|-
|Southern Utah
|Cedar City, UT
|Thunderbirds
|Eccles Coliseum
|8,500
|WAC
|2022
|-
|Utah Tech|
|Trailblazers
|Greater Zion Stadium
|10,000
| WAC
|2021
|-
|UTRGV'|Edinburg, TX
|Vaqueros
|TBD
|TBD
|WAC(forming a new program)
|2024
|}

Conference championships

By year

By team

Championship game

Bowl games
The first bowl game appearance by a WAC team was at the 1964 Liberty Bowl, where Utah defeated West Virginia of the Southern Conference, 32–6.

The WAC had conference tie-ins with various bowl games during its history, including:
 Famous Idaho Potato Bowl (2000–2012)
 Hawaii Bowl (2002–2011)
 Holiday Bowl (1978–1997)

Bowl Championship Series
The WAC champion received an automatic berth in one of the five Bowl Championship Series (BCS) bowl games if they were the highest ranked non-automatic qualifying conference champion and either of the following:
 Ranked in the top 12 of the BCS Rankings.
 Ranked in the top 16 of the BCS Rankings and its ranking was higher than that of an automatic qualifying conference champion.

By qualifying under the first criterion above, Boise State landed a berth in the 2007 Fiesta Bowl, and Hawaii  received a bid to play in the 2008 Sugar Bowl. In 2009, the Mountain West champion TCU Horned Frogs received the automatic BCS bid by finishing higher than Boise State in the final BCS rankings. However, Boise State received a BCS at-large bid and defeated TCU in the 2010 Fiesta Bowl. In three BCS bowl games, the WAC recorded two wins and one loss. In addition to those three teams that played in BCS bowls, four other WAC teams qualified for a BCS berth but were not selected to play in a BCS bowl game: TCU in 2000 and Boise State in 2004, 2008, and 2010.

Rivalries
Notable football rivalries involving WAC teams are listed below.  Records are not'' limited to years that the WAC was active.

Divisional alignment
Starting in 1996, the 16 conference members were divided info four pods, each with four teams. Two pods comprised the Pacific Division, and the other two pods were the Mountain Division. Pod one would always compete in Pacific, while pod four would always compete in Mountain. The other two pods were scheduled to swap divisions every two years, with the new alignment to take effect in even-numbered years. The pods and divisional alignment were discontinued after 1998.

References